Jinnat Hossain is a Bangladeshi film editor. He won Bangladesh National Film Award for Best Editing twice for the film Satya Mithya (1990) and Commander (1994).

Selected films

Awards and nominations
National Film Awards

References

External links

Living people
Bangladeshi editors
Best Editor National Film Award (Bangladesh) winners
Year of birth missing (living people)